This is a list of snakes found in New Jersey, United States.

Non-venomous

Venomous 
{| class="wikitable"	
!width="75"|Image	
!width="225"|Binomial name	
!width="200"|Name	
!width="225"|Map	
|-	
|||Agkistrodon contortrix mokasen ||Northern copperhead|| 	
|-	
|||Crotalus horridus ||Timber rattlesnake||

References

Snakes
New Jersey